Garab-e Sofla (also Romanized as Garāb-e Sofla; also known as Garab-e-Pain (گراب پائين), also Romanized as Garāb-e Pā’īn) is a city in and the capital of Ludab District, in Boyer-Ahmad County, Kohgiluyeh and Boyer-Ahmad Province, Iran. At the 2006 census, its population was 416, in 84 families.

References

Populated places in Boyer-Ahmad County

Cities in Kohgiluyeh and Boyer-Ahmad Province